Private Investigator (P.I.) was an Indian crime fiction-detective TV series which aired on Star Plus on Sunday evening. It was produced by Fremantle Media India Productions. It starred Mrinal Dutt as Raffe Roy Choudhary in the main lead.

Overview
The main character, Raffe Roy Choudhary, was a 21-year old first-year Criminology student and was extremely enthusiastic towards the happenings and crimes around him and wanted to help solve these criminal cases. He helped the police Inspector Tiwari in several crime cases. His natural instincts and sharp problem-solving skills helped to solve crime cases.

Cast
 Mrinal Dutt as Raffe Roy Choudhary/Satya
 Sandhya Mridul as Anita Roy Choudhary/Nivedita (Raffe's mother)
 Vrajesh Hirjee as Inspector A K Tiwari
 Roshan Preet as Raghav
 Priya Chauhan as Dhanalakshmi Rajalakshmi Shrijaya Venkataraman (aka Lucky)
 Aamir Bashir as Vijay Clamaine Pereira (aka VC)
 Athar Siddiqui as Abhijeet
 Manasi Varma as Kamini Mehra (Episode 13)

Reception

Critical reviews 
Letty Mariam Abraham of Bollywood Life rated the series at a 2.5/5 and wrote "Private Investigator has the potential to be something really interesting. For now the series is just about average with really nothing too interesting or out of the world."

References

External links
 P.I. Official on Hotstar

2014 Indian television series debuts
Hindi-language television shows
Television shows set in Mumbai
Indian crime television series
Detective television series
StarPlus original programming